In applied mathematics, the Atkinson–Mingarelli theorem, named after Frederick Valentine Atkinson and A. B. Mingarelli, concerns eigenvalues of certain Sturm–Liouville differential operators.

In the simplest of formulations let p, q, w be real-valued piecewise continuous functions defined on a closed bounded real interval, . The function w(x), which is sometimes denoted by r(x), is called the "weight" or "density" function. Consider the Sturm–Liouville differential equation

where y is a function of the independent variable x. In this case, y is called a solution if it is continuously differentiable on (a,b) and (p y′)(x) is piecewise continuously differentiable and y satisfies the equation at all except a finite number of points in (a,b). The unknown function y is typically required to satisfy some boundary conditions at a and b.

The boundary conditions under consideration here are usually called separated boundary conditions and they are of the form:

We define

The theorem 

and an infinite number of negative eigenvalues ,

whose spectral asymptotics are given by their solution [2] of Jörgens' Conjecture [3]:

and

For more information on the general theory behind see the article on Sturm–Liouville theory.

References 

 F. V. Atkinson, A. B. Mingarelli, Multiparameter Eigenvalue Problems – Sturm–Liouville Theory, CRC Press, Taylor and Francis, 2010. 
 F. V. Atkinson, A. B. Mingarelli, Asymptotics of the number of zeros and of the eigenvalues of general weighted Sturm–Liouville problems, J. für die Reine und Ang. Math. (Crelle), 375/376 (1987), 380–393. See also free download of the original paper.
 K. Jörgens, Spectral theory of second-order ordinary differential operators, Lectures delivered at Aarhus Universitet, 1962/63.

Ordinary differential equations
Theorems in analysis